Rothia dentocariosa is a species of Gram-positive, round- to rod-shaped bacteria that is part of the normal community of microbes residing in the mouth and respiratory tract.

First isolated from dental caries, Rothia dentocariosa is largely benign, but does very rarely cause disease. The most common Rothia infection is endocarditis, typically in people with underlying heart valve disorders. Literature case reports show other tissues that are rarely infected include the peritoneum, tonsils, lung, cornea, inner layers of the eye (Endophthalmitis) and brain and intercranial tissues.
It has been implicated in periodontal disease, and one hypothesis is that Rothia periodontal disease, or dental procedures in turn, may be first steps in the infection of other tissues. A study regarding the relationship between COVID-19 and bacterial communities found that Rothia dentocariosa was highly predictive of COVID-19. In a hospital, samples from COVID-19 patients and their rooms were collected, then tested for COVID-19, and also characterized microbial communities. Found to have the greatest prevalence in all positive COVID-19 samples was Rothia dentocariosa. One case reports on a fatal Rothia dentocariosa infection of a fetus in utero. Another reports the bacterium was responsible for septic arthritis in the knee of a person treated with etanercept for rheumatoid arthritis. Like other Rothia infections reported in the literature, once the cause of infection was identified, this responded fully to treatment with antibiotics. Rothia infections may be treated with penicillins, erythromycin,  cefazolin, rifampin, aminoglycoside, tetracycline, chloramphenicol, and trimethoprim-sulfamethoxazole.

Variable or pleomorphic in shape and similar to Actinomyces and Nocardia, Rothia was only defined as a genus in 1967. Rothia dentocariosa, like several other species of oral bacteria, is able to reduce nitrate to nitrite, and one study found it in 3% of isolates of nitrate-reducing bacteria from the mouth.

References

External links
 Type strain of Rothia dentocariosa at BacDive -  the Bacterial Diversity Metadatabase

Micrococcaceae
Gram-positive bacteria
Bacteria described in 1949